Michael Griffin (September 9, 1842December 29, 1899) was an Irish American immigrant, lawyer, and politician.  He was a member of the United States House of Representatives from Wisconsin, and served in the Wisconsin Legislature.  As a young man, he served as a Union Army officer in the American Civil War.

Early life
Born in County Clare on the island of Ireland (the entirety of which was then part of the U.K.), Griffin immigrated with his parents, John and Hannah Griffin, to the British Canadian colonies in 1847, and then to Ohio in 1851.  He moved to Wisconsin in 1856 and settled in Newport, Sauk County.  He attended the common schools of Ohio and Wisconsin.

On September 11, 1861, he enlisted as a private in the Union Army for service in the American Civil War.  He was enrolled in Company E, 12th Wisconsin Infantry Regiment, and served until the close of the war, attaining the rank of first lieutenant.

He moved to Kilbourn City, Wisconsin, after the war, in 1865.  He studied law and was admitted to the bar in 1868, commencing practice in Kilbourn City.  He married Emma Irene Daniels on September 6, 1871. He was cashier of the Bank of Kilbourn from 1871 until 1876.

Political career

He served as member of the County Board of Columbia County, Wisconsin, in 1874 and 1875. He served as member of the Wisconsin State Assembly in 1876. He moved to Eau Claire, Wisconsin, in 1876, and was City attorney of Eau Claire in 1878 and 1879. He served in the Wisconsin State Senate in 1880 and 1881.

He was the Department commander of the Grand Army of the Republic in 1887 and 1888. In 1894, he was elected as a Republican to the Fifty-third Congress to fill the vacancy in Wisconsin's 7th congressional district caused by the death of George B. Shaw. He was reelected to the following two congresses as well, serving from November 5, 1894, to March 3, 1899.  He was not a candidate for renomination in 1898.

He was appointed chairman of the State tax commission by Governor Edward Scofield on May 28, 1899.

Later life
He died of a stroke in Eau Claire, Wisconsin, on December 29, 1899. He was interred in Eau Claire's Forest Hill Cemetery. In 1972, he posthumously received a single protest vote for Vice President by a disgruntled delegate in that year's Democratic National Convention.

Electoral history

Wisconsin Assembly (1875)

| colspan="6" style="text-align:center;background-color: #e9e9e9;"| General Election, November 2, 1875

Wisconsin Senate (1879)

| colspan="6" style="text-align:center;background-color: #e9e9e9;"| General Election, November 4, 1879

U.S. House of Representatives (1894, 1896)

| colspan="6" style="text-align:center;background-color: #e9e9e9;"| Special Election, November 6, 1894

| colspan="6" style="text-align:center;background-color: #e9e9e9;"| General Election, November 6, 1894

| colspan="6" style="text-align:center;background-color: #e9e9e9;"| General Election, November 3, 1896

References

External links

1842 births
1899 deaths
People from County Clare
Politicians from Eau Claire, Wisconsin
People from Wisconsin Dells, Wisconsin
County supervisors in Wisconsin
Republican Party Wisconsin state senators
Republican Party members of the Wisconsin State Assembly
Union Army officers
Irish emigrants to the United States (before 1923)
Irish soldiers in the United States Army
People of Wisconsin in the American Civil War
Republican Party members of the United States House of Representatives from Wisconsin
19th-century American politicians
Grand Army of the Republic officials